Joey Archibald (February 20, 1914 – February 3, 1998) was a National Boxing Association (NBA) world featherweight boxing champion in April 1939.   He was managed by Al Weill, and his trainer was Charlie Goldman.

Early life
Archibald was born on February 20, 1914, in Providence, Rhode Island. He attended Providence College before his boxing career took off, and once studied for the priesthood.

Setting himself up for a title shot on September 12, 1938, he defeated Tony Dupre, former holder of the 1936 USA New England Bantamweight Title, in a ten-round points decision at Griffith Stadium in Washington D.C.

NYSAC World Featherweight champion, October, 1938
Archibald won the NYSAC version of the then vacant world featherweight championship when he defeated Mike Belloise, former NYSE featherweight champion, in a fifteen-round points decision at New York's lost boxing shrine, St. Nicholas Arena, on October 17, 1938.  He had previously beaten Belloise on July 11, 1938, on points in a close ten round unanimous decision in Washington, D.C. 

Belloise and Archibald were chosen to fight for the title by commissioners of the New York State Athletic Commission, causing some controversy as several top contenders were overlooked.  The National Boxing Association had previously decided to give recognition to Archibald if he could subsequently defeat Leo Rodak.   

Belloise's boxing and the accuracy of his punching were considered below par for a title match by some reporters. Belloise started strong in the first before a vocal crowd of nearly 7,000, but dropped the second through the fifth rounds to Archibald's continuous blows to his waist and body. In the sixth, Belloise was staggered by Archibald with a succession of hooks that drove him across the ring.  In the eleventh through the fifteenth, Archibald came back to gain dominance. Two of the three judges gave the bout to Archibald, with the referee voting a tie, while Ed Hughes of the Brooklyn Daily Eagle gave ten to Archibald, three to Belloise, and two even. In a similar scoring, the United Press gave nine rounds to Archibald, with three to Belloise, and three even.

On December 5, 1938, while still holding the NYSAC featherweight title, Archibald lost to Petey Scalzo in a second-round knockout at Royal Windsor Arena in New York.  The bout was not a title fight, and certainly not recognized as one by the National Boxing Association (NBA), a sanctioning body with a wider range and more prestige than the NYSAC.  In the first round, Archibald received a hard right to the chin, but managed to rally to keep the round even.  After finding an opening in the second round, Scalzo delivered three powerful right hooks to the chin of Archibald that dropped him 2 minutes, and 10 seconds after the bell. The win would cement Scalzo as the leading contender for the National Boxing Association's world featherweight championship, though Archibald's management never scheduled a rematch.

On February 6, 1939, Archibald defeated Al Mancini at Rhode Island Auditorium in Providence in a ten-round non-title points decision.

NBA World Featherweight Champion, April, 1939
He gained universal recognition and the NBA world featherweight championship when he defeated Leo Rodak before a crowd of 5,500 on April 18, 1939, in a fifteen-round points decision at Rhode Island Auditorium in Providence. Rodak was considered the top contender for the NYSAC world featherweight title.  Archibald was the aggressor throughout his bout with Rodak, and landed the most punches in the opinion of the referee who scored for him.  The Associated Press gave seven rounds to Archibald, with six for Rodak and two even. Both fighters committed fouls in the eleventh, a round declared even by the referee as was the closely fought seventh. In the thirteenth and fourteenth, with the bout  close but Archibald leading by a shade, Rodak broke loose and gained the advantage with long and wary rights.  The fifteenth clearly went to Archibald.  After the fight, Rodak's manager complained of frequent low blows by Archibald.

First NBA Feather title defense, 1939
He defeated Henry Jeffra in his first defense of the featherweight world title in a fifteen-round split decision on September 28, 1939, at Griffith Stadium in Washington, D.C.  The referee was the exceptional ex-lightweight champion Benny Leonard who scored ten rounds for Archibald, with only four for Jeffra, though one judged seriously dissented giving ten rounds to Jeffra.  The remaining judge gave nine rounds to Archibald.  The sports writers who covered the bout unanimously favored Jeffra, as did the crowd of 10,000 who heavily booed and threw newspapers into the ring for five minutes after the split decision was announced.

Loss of NBA World Feather title, April, 1940
The NBA withdrew the world featherweight title from Archibald in April 1940 for his refusal to fight leading contenders, particularly Petey Scalzo.

Loss of NYSAC World Feather Title, May, 1940
Archibald lost the NYSAC and Baltimore version of the world featherweight title to Harry Jeffra on May 20, 1940, in a fifteen-round Unanimous Decision at the Coliseum in Baltimore.  Jeffra was knocked to the canvas three times in the second round, twice for a count of nine. Archibald landed his blows in earnest in the eighth and ninth rounds with lefts to the body, but was far too behind on points to pull ahead.  The Associated Press gave Jeffra seven rounds, Archibald three, with five even.

Retaking the NYSAC World Feather title, May, 1941
Archibald regained the NYSAC version of the world featherweight title from Jeffra on May 12, 1941, in a fifteen-round split decision at Griffith Stadium in Washington before a small crowd of 1,800.  With his victory, he also won championship recognition from Maryland, Pennsylvania, and California.  Starting as an underdog at odds of 8-5, Archibald came back in the ninth through fourteenth rounds after suffering from a slow start that saw Jeffra leading on points, and then weathered a furious attack from Jeffra in the final round.  In a close bout, only referee scored for Jeffra, with both judges backing Archibald.

Final loss of NYSAC World Feather title, September 1941
Jeffra's reign was short lived as Chalky Wright knocked him out on September 11, 1941, before a crowd of 5,500 to overtake the crown in an eleventh-round knockout at Griffith Stadium in Washington D.C.  Wright knocked Archibald to the canvas 54 seconds into the eleventh with a left hook and a powerful straight right, though he was well ahead on points before the knockout.  Archibald lost the first eight rounds by a substantial margin.

Before a crowd of 5,500 on June 23, 1942, Archibald lost to the great and undefeated Willie Pep, at Bulkely Stadium, Hartford, Connecticut in an eight-round points decision.  There was only one knockdown in the bout when Archibald hit the canvas for a fleeting second in the seventh round.  Referee Louis "Kid" Kaplan scored all eight rounds for Pep.  Archibald, who still had his speed, was unable to land more than three punches that landed cleanly against the crafty Pep, who retained an exceptional defense throughout the bout which lacked thrills but was clearly an exceptional display between two highly skilled opponents.

Despite his fine effort against Jeffra to regain the title, Archibald appeared to be a fighter in decline after 1939, though he continued to fight high quality opponents.  He lost 27 out of 34 fights from July 1939 until his retirement from the ring in August 1943. His final record was 60 wins (29 KOs), 42 losses and 5 draws.

Professional boxing record

Boxing Achievements and Honors

|-

|-

See also
List of featherweight boxing champions

References

External links
 
Joey Archibald - CBZ Profile

1914 births
1998 deaths
Boxers from Rhode Island
Featherweight boxers
World featherweight boxing champions
American male boxers
Sportspeople from Providence, Rhode Island